Varuna is the debut album by the Long Island indie rock band The Republic of Wolves. It was originally released on iTunes and physically on their web store on November 30, 2010. It has also been released on vinyl record by Simple Stereo. The album was recorded, mixed, and mastered by guitarist/vocalist Gregg Andrew DellaRocca at his home studio and was produced by the band members themselves.

Track listing
All songs written by Gregg Andrew DellaRocca, Billy Duprey, Mason Maggio, Christian Van Deurs, and Chris Wall.

References

External links
The Republic of Wolves on iTunes
The Republic of Wolves - Varuna on Simple Stereo

2010 debut albums
The Republic of Wolves albums
Self-released albums